Forgotten Flowers is a Canadian comedy film, directed by André Forcier and released in 2019. The film stars Roy Dupuis as Albert Payette, an agronomist who has lived in seclusion making mead since becoming disillusioned with his former career, but whose life is turned upside down when the late Brother Marie-Victorin Kirouac (Yves Jacques) returns to earth to enlist his help in an environmental campaign to take down his former employer Transgenia over its line of toxic pesticides.

The film also stars Juliette Gosselin as Lili de Rosbil and Christine Beaulieu as Mathilde Gauvreau, a journalist and lawyer who also become involved in the campaign, and Mylène Mackay as Mathilde's ancestor Marcelle, a fellow botanist with whom Marie-Victorin had an emotional, but not physical, romantic relationship with prior to his death. Other cast members include Émile Schneider, Donald Pilon, Dorothée Berryman and France Castel.

The film had its theatrical premiere on September 16, 2019 at the Cinéfest Sudbury International Film Festival, before premiering commercially on October 25.

References

External links
 

2019 films
Canadian comedy films
Films shot in Quebec
Films set in Quebec
Films directed by André Forcier
French-language Canadian films
2010s Canadian films